The 10th Bangladesh National Film Awards were presented by the Ministry of Information, Bangladesh, to felicitate the best of Bangladeshi cinema released in the year 1985. The Bangladesh National Film Awards is a film award ceremony in Bangladesh established in 1975 by the government of Bangladesh. Every year, a national panel appointed by the government selects the winning entry, and the award ceremony is held in Dhaka. 1985 was the 10th ceremony of the Bangladesh National Film Award.

List of winners
A total of 14 artists were awarded in this ceremony. Best Film and Best Male Playback Singer awards were not given in 1985.

Merit awards

Technical awards

See also
 Meril Prothom Alo Awards
 Ifad Film Club Award
 Babisas Award

References

External links

National Film Awards (Bangladesh) ceremonies
1985 film awards
1986 awards in Bangladesh
1986 in Dhaka
December 1986 events in Bangladesh